Kember is a surname. Notable people with the surname include: 

Gerald Kember (born 1945), New Zealand rugby player
Hamish Kember (born 1968), New Zealand cricketer
Harry J. Kember Jr. (1934–2012), American politician
Lorraine Kember (born 1950), Australian author
Norman Kember (born 1931), British professor of biophysics
Owen Kember (1943–2004), English cricketer
Peter Kember (born 1965), English singer and record producer
Ros Kember (born 1985), New Zealand cricketer
RW Kember (born 1983), South African rugby player
Steve Kember (born 1948), English footballer